Jackson Park was a terminal on the Jackson Park Branch of the Chicago 'L'. The station opened on May 12, 1893, and closed on October 31, 1893, with the conclusion of the World's Columbian Exposition.

References

External links
 Jackson Park station page at Chicago-L.org
Defunct Chicago "L" stations
Railway stations in the United States opened in 1893
Railway stations closed in 1893
1893 establishments in Illinois
1893 disestablishments in the United States
Chicago "L" terminal stations